Route 595 is a  long north–south secondary highway in the eastern portion of New Brunswick, Canada.

The route starts at Route 585 in Harten Corner east of the town of Woodstock. The road travels southeast past Bull Lake and through the community of Bull Lake. The road continues through West Waterville, Central Waterville and Temperance Vale. It crosses the Nackawic River before ending at Route 605 in Pinder.

See also

References

595
595